The Ex-Factor may refer to:
 The Ex-Factor (Legends of Tomorrow)
 The Ex-Factor (The O.C.)
 "Ex-Factor", a 1998 song by Lauryn Hill

See also
 X Factor (disambiguation)